The Kai coucal (Centropus spilopterus) is a species of cuckoo in the family Cuculidae.
It is endemic to the Kai Islands of Indonesia. It was formerly considered a subspecies of the pheasant coucal (C. phasianus).

References

Kai coucal
Birds of the Kai Islands
Kai coucal
Kai coucal
Taxonomy articles created by Polbot